Max Hoff (born 12 September 1982) is a German sprint canoeist and former wildwater canoeist who has competed since the late 2000s. He has won a total of eight medals at the ICF Canoe Sprint World Championships with five golds (K-1 1000 m: 2009, 2010, 2013; K-1 5000 m: 2011 and K-4 1000 m: 2011 ) and three silvers (K-1 5000 m: 2010, 2014, 2015).

At the 2012 Summer Olympics, he won the bronze medal in the K-1 1000 m. Four years later, at the 2016 Summer Olympics, he won a gold medal in the K-4 1000 m event as well as finishing seventh overall in the K-1 1000m event. He finished fifth in the K-1 1000 m event at the 2008 Summer Olympics in Beijing.

References

External links

Personal website

1982 births
Living people
People from Troisdorf
Sportspeople from Cologne (region)
Canoeists at the 2008 Summer Olympics
Canoeists at the 2012 Summer Olympics
Canoeists at the 2016 Summer Olympics
Canoeists at the 2020 Summer Olympics
German male canoeists
Olympic canoeists of Germany
Olympic gold medalists for Germany
Olympic silver medalists for Germany
Olympic bronze medalists for Germany
Olympic medalists in canoeing
ICF Canoe Sprint World Championships medalists in kayak
Medalists at the 2012 Summer Olympics
Medalists at the 2016 Summer Olympics
Medalists at the 2020 Summer Olympics
European Games medalists in canoeing
European Games gold medalists for Germany
Canoeists at the 2015 European Games
Canoeists at the 2019 European Games
European Games bronze medalists for Germany